Leptaleum is a genus of flowering plants belonging to the family Brassicaceae.

Its native range is Eastern Mediterranean to Xinjiang and Pakistan, Arabian Peninsula.

Species
Species:
 Leptaleum filifolium (Willd.) DC.

References

Brassicaceae
Brassicaceae genera